Mirotenthes digitipes is a therocephalian known from Late Permian Cistecephalus Assemblage Zone of South Africa.

References 

Eutherocephalians
Therocephalia genera